Meshkiangasher was a legendary king mentioned in the Sumerian King List as the priest of the Eanna temple in Uruk, whose journey led him to the enter the sea and ascend the mountains.

Mythology 
The King list mentions Meshkiangasher as a descendant of the sun god Utu, who became the high priest of Inanna in the Eanna temple reigning for 324 years, and conceived his son and successor to the throne Enmerkar. His epithet concludes with his descent to the sea and ascent to the mountains, a journey which has been compared to the trajectory of the sun, believed by the Sumerians that made the exact travel and suitable for the "son of the sun-god".

Historical king 
Unlike his successors, Meshkiangasher is not found in any poem or hymn besides the King list. His reign has long been suspected to be a fabrication during the Ur III period due to the Sumerian-Akkadian hybrid structure of his name, the element MES, which occurs in historical royal names of Ur, and the tradition about his disappearance. The fabrication of king Meshkiangasher could be an arrangement to separate the god Utu from being the biological father of Enmerkar, as mentioned in Enmerkar and the Lord of Aratta, and giving him a royal descendant instead.

See also
List of people who disappeared mysteriously at sea

References

Notes

Inanna
Kings of Uruk
Longevity myths
Missing person cases in Asia
People lost at sea
Sumerian kings